The Kress Building is a historic commercial building at 210 West Main Street in Blytheville, Arkansas.  It is a two-story concrete and steel structure, faced in brick and terra cotta.  Built in 1938, it was one of the first buildings in the city to be built using steel framing, and is one of its finest Art Deco structures.  The first floor areas (outside the plate glass store windows) are faced in terra cotta, while the second floor is predominantly cream-colored brick.  Windows on the second floor are surrounded by ivory terra cotta incised with fluting and shell patterns.

S. H. Kress and Co. operated from the store until 1974. A Family Dollar Store operated from the building from the mid to late 80's. Later, the building housed the local United Way. It was donated to the town and then renovated in 1997 to serve as the Blytheville Heritage Museum and the Blytheville Main Street office. Delta Gateway Museum opened in the Kress Building in November 2011.

The building was listed on the National Register of Historic Places in 1997. It is in the Blytheville Commercial Historic District, also listed on the NRHP.

See also
National Register of Historic Places listings in Mississippi County, Arkansas

References

Commercial buildings on the National Register of Historic Places in Arkansas
Art Deco architecture in Arkansas
Commercial buildings completed in 1938
S. H. Kress & Co.
National Register of Historic Places in Mississippi County, Arkansas
1938 establishments in Arkansas
Blytheville, Arkansas
Museums in Mississippi County, Arkansas
Individually listed contributing properties to historic districts on the National Register in Arkansas